Pennsylvania Township is located in Mason County, Illinois, United States. As of the 2010 census, its population was 206 and it contained 92 housing units.

Geography

Demographics

Home of the pencils. Window sills. Vanity.

References

External links
City-data.com
Illinois State Archives

Townships in Mason County, Illinois
Townships in Illinois